The International Journal of General Systems is a peer-reviewed scientific journal covering research on basic and applied aspects of systems science and systems methodology. Its focus is on "general systems" – systems ideas that have general applicability. The founding editor of the journal was George Klir, who served as editor-in-chief from 1974 to 2014. Since 2015, the editor-in-chief has been Radim Belohlavek.

According to the Journal Citation Reports, the journal has a 2014 impact factor of 1.637.

See also 
 List of systems science journals

References

External links 
 

Publications established in 1974
Systems journals
English-language journals
Taylor & Francis academic journals